Dame Thora Hird  (28 May 1911 – 15 March 2003) was an English actress and comedian, presenter and writer. In a career spanning over 70 years, she appeared in more than 100 film and television roles, becoming a household name and a British institution.

A three-time winner of the BAFTA TV Award for Best Actress, she won for Talking Heads: A Cream Cracker Under the Settee (1988), Talking Heads: Waiting for the Telegram (1998) and Lost for Words (1999). Her film credits included The Love Match (1955), The Entertainer (1960), A Kind of Loving (1962) and The Nightcomers (1971).

Early life and career 
Hird was born on 28 May 1911 in the Lancashire seaside town of Morecambe to James Henry Hird and Jane Mary (née Mayor). Her family background was largely theatrical: her mother had been an actress, while her father managed a number of entertainment venues in Morecambe, including the Royalty Theatre, where Hird made her first appearance, and the West End Pier. Thora first appeared on stage at the age of two months in a play her father was managing, carried on stage in her mother's arms. She worked at the local Co-operative store before joining the Morecambe Repertory Theatre.

Hird often described her father, who initially did not want her to be an actress, as her sternest critic and attributed much of her talent as an actress and comedian to his guidance. In 1944 she made her West End debut in the Esther McCracken play No Medals.

Although Hird left Morecambe in the late 1940s, she retained her affection for the town, referring to herself as a "sand grown 'un", the colloquial term for anyone born in Morecambe.

Initially, Hird made regular appearances in films, including the wartime propaganda film Went the Day Well? (1942, known as 48 Hours in the USA), in which she is shown wielding a rifle to defend a house from German paratroopers. She worked with the British film comedian Will Hay and featured in The Entertainer (1960), which starred Laurence Olivier, as well as A Kind of Loving (1962) with Alan Bates and June Ritchie.

Hird gained her highest profile in television comedy, notably the sitcoms Meet the Wife (1963–66), In Loving Memory (1979–86), Hallelujah! (1983–84) and, for nearly two decades, as Edie Pegden in Last of the Summer Wine (1986–2003). Hird played a variety of roles, including the nurse in Romeo and Juliet, and won BAFTA Best Actress awards for her roles in two of Alan Bennett's Talking Heads monologues.

Hird starred as Captain Emily Ridley in the sitcom Hallelujah! (1983–84) about the Salvation Army, a movement for which she had a soft spot throughout her life. Hird also portrayed Mrs Speck, the housekeeper of the Mayor of Gloucester, in The Tailor of Gloucester (1989).

In 1993 she played Annie Longden, mother of Deric Longden in Wide-Eyed and Legless (known as The Wedding Gift outside the UK) and reprised her role in the 1999 TV film Lost for Words, which won her a BAFTA for Best Actress.

Religious broadcasts 
Hird was a committed Christian, hosting the religious programme Praise Be!, a spin off from Songs of Praise on the BBC. Her work for charity and on television in spite of old age and ill health made her an institution. Her advertisements for Churchill stairlifts also kept her in the public eye.

Honours 
She was created an Officer of the Order of the British Empire (OBE) in the 1983 Birthday Honours and raised to Dame Commander (DBE) in the 1993 Birthday Honours. She received an honorary D.Litt. from Lancaster University in 1989.

Later life 
In December 1998, using a wheelchair, Hird played a brief but energetic cameo role as the mother of Dolly on Dinnerladies, a sarcastic character who was particularly bitter towards her daughter.

In mid-December 1999, Hird recorded four Alfie story books written and illustrated by Shirley Hughes for a double-sided audio cassette release, creating memorable voices for every character as well as Alfie himself.

Her final acting work was for BBC Radio 7, which was recorded and broadcast in 2002: a monologue written for her by Alan Bennett entitled The Last of the Sun, in which she played a forthright, broad-minded woman, immobile in an old people's home but still able to take a stand against the censorious and politically correct attitudes of her own daughter.

This Is Your Life 
She was the subject of This Is Your Life on two occasions: in January 1964 when she was surprised by Eamonn Andrews, and in December 1996, when Michael Aspel surprised her while filming on location for Last of the Summer Wine.

Personal life, death and memorial 
Hird underwent a heart bypass operation in 1992. She suffered from severe arthritis and used a wheelchair in her later life. She died on 15 March 2003 aged 91.

A memorial service was held on 15 September 2003 at Westminster Abbey attended by more than 2000 people, including Alan Bennett, Sir David Frost, Melvyn Bragg and Victoria Wood.

On 7 July 2019 a commemorative blue plaque was installed to Thora Hird by The Theatre and Film Guild of Great Britain and America, at the Bayswater home where she lived for over 60 years.

Marriage 
Hird married musician James Scott in 1937. They had a daughter, actress Janette Scott, in 1938. Hird was mother-in-law to jazz singer Mel Tormé for eleven years.
Hird was widowed in 1994, having been married for 57 years.

Filmography

Film

Television

Bibliography 
 Dame Thora Hird's autobiography, Scene And Hird (1976),

References

External links
 
 
 
 "Actress Dame Thora Hird dies" – BBC News article, last updated 15 March 2003
 "Obituary: Dame Thora Hird" – BBC News obituary, last updated 15 March 2003
 Dame Thora Hird – obituary from The Guardian, by Veronica Horwell, dated 17 March 2003

1911 births
2003 deaths
Actresses awarded damehoods
Best Actress BAFTA Award (television) winners
Dames Commander of the Order of the British Empire
English film actresses
English television actresses
People associated with Lancaster University
People from Morecambe
English Christians
20th-century English actresses
21st-century English actresses
British comedy actresses